Esmond Frederick "Tommy" McConville (28 March 1901 – 23 May 1969) was an Australian rules footballer who played with Melbourne in the Victorian Football League (VFL).

McConville was recruited from the Donald Football Club. and represented Victoria in 1927.

See also
 1927 Melbourne Carnival

Notes

External links 

 
 Demonwiki profile

1901 births
1969 deaths
Australian rules footballers from Victoria (Australia)
Melbourne Football Club players